Hatton is an unincorporated community in Colbert County, Alabama, United States.

References

Unincorporated communities in Colbert County, Alabama
Unincorporated communities in Alabama